New York's 94th State Assembly district is one of the 150 districts in the New York State Assembly. It has been represented by Matt Slater since 2023, succeeding Kevin Byrne.

Geography 
District 94 is in the Hudson Valley, containing portions of Putnam and Westchester counties. It includes the towns of Mahopac, Yorktown Heights, Brewster, Brewster Hill, Lincolndale, and Patterson and the hamlet of Carmel.

Recent election results

2022

2020

2018

2016

2014

2012

References 

94
Westchester County, New York
Putnam County, New York